Watt/I-80 West station is an at-grade light rail station on the Blue Line of the Sacramento RT Light Rail system operated by the Sacramento Regional Transit District. The station is located in the median of Interstate 80 west of its intersection of Watt Avenue, after which the station is named, in the city of North Highlands, California.

The station along with a 248 space park and ride lot, reused a partially built, but later abandoned freeway project.

Platforms and tracks

References 

Sacramento Regional Transit light rail stations
Railway stations in the United States opened in 1987
Railway stations in highway medians